Sanctioned Suicide (SS) is an anonymous internet forum known for its unrestricted discussion of suicide and suicide methods. The forum was founded in 2018 by self-described incels Diego Joaquín Galante and Lamarcus Small, known respectively by online pseudonyms Serge and Marquis, as the successor to the banned subreddit r/SanctionedSuicide. Sanctioned Suicide drew over 10 million page views in September 2022 and as of March 2023, the forum has over 30,000 members. Although the forum frames itself as a "pro-choice" suicide forum, the forum has been widely described as a pro-suicide forum.

The forum has generated intense scrutiny from news outlets and government officials for the encouragement of suicide by members on the site, as well as the promotion of the use of sodium nitrite as a method of suicide, a previously obscure method. One New York Times report found 45 adults and children who died in connection to the site, and a later report found dozens more. The BBC has identified 21 people who have died in connection to the site in the United Kingdom. Access to the forum has been restricted in Australia, Italy, and Germany.

History 

r/SanctionedSuicide and Sanctioned Suicide have been described as the successors of Usenet newsgroup alt.suicide.holiday and a homonymously named forum accessible through the Tor network.

On March 14, 2018, the r/SanctionedSuicide subreddit was banned for breaking Reddit's rules on the promotion of violence, prompting Galante and Small to create the site. Following the naming of the two co-founders by The New York Times in 2021, Galante and Small resigned from the site, handing the forum over to a member going by the username RainAndSadness.

The New York Times investigation
Megan Twohey and Gabriel Dance of The New York Times reportedly discovered the full names of the site founders following the 2021 data breach of the domain registrar Epik. Twohey and Dance obtained photos of Galante and Small that matched previous appearances of Serge and Marquis. When contacted by The New York Times, Small stated that he had no involvement with the website, while Galante acknowledged using the pseudonym Serge on the forum but denied founding or operating it. The New York Times notes that the 'Marquis' alias had described the 'Serge' alias as a co-founder of the website which conferred on rules and practices.

In an interview with the Poynter Institute, Twohey stated that the potential of raising the profile of the forum or of specific suicide methods were "two of the biggest ethical issues that we had ever dealt with."

Overlap with incel forums
Galante and Small describe themselves as incels and have been found to run a number of incel and manosphere related forums where members condone, downplay, or advocate violence against women. In a September 2022 report, the Center for Countering Digital Hate described one of the forums as the largest forum dedicated to incel ideology. Sanctioned Suicide has been noted as the only forum run by Galante and Small that does not restrict access by women.

The incel communities run by Small and Galante promote the "blackpill," a misogynistic and biological determinist ideology. Tim Squirrel of the Institute for Strategic Dialogue stated that "blackpill" communities commonly condone or advocate for suicide or mass violence. Squirrel, while speaking about his report, says that the aforementioned incel wiki community members sometimes links to a forum with suicide instructions.

Deaths
The 2021 New York Times investigation identified multiple individuals who died by suicide following activity on Sanctioned Suicide, including a 16-year-old who died by suicide after being encouraged by members of the site in response to a post on the site about his abdominal pain and anxiety. The investigation also identified a 22-year-old woman from Glasgow who died by suicide after meeting Craig McInally through the site; McInally had previously sexually assaulted and assisted in the suicides of several other women through the forum. In December 2022, McInally pled guilty to culpable and reckless conduct, with a sexual element and is believed to be the first person arrested in connection to the site.

An Australian reportedly died by suicide after members of Sanctioned Suicide taunted him and asked him to film his death. An investigation from the Australian Broadcasting Corporation reported on another Australian who died after being on the website. His family says messages found on his device after his death indicate he was unsure about suicide and they believed that the Sanctioned Suicide forum was a tipping point for him. The family proceeded to contact politicians and law enforcement.

A survey on Sanctioned Suicide claimed that half of their users were below age 25. Multiple reported mothers of dead children from the site have been publicly calling on the website to shut down. Galante and the rest of the staff are reported to have helped with preparations for user suicides, with Galante writing on the forum, "If you're preparing your departure, please contact a mod so we can help with preparations".  Small also said that people who registered only to use the recovery forum “will be denied most likely.”

Legal response
In March 2020, the site was removed from online search results in Germany. Prosecutors in Italy blocked access to the site in June 2021 following the deaths of two Italian teenagers by suicide. 

A December 2021 The New York Times article identified 45 people who died by suicide after spending time on the website. In response, Uruguayan law enforcement has launched an investigation against Galante, who resides in Uruguay. However, sources from the Prosecutor's Office say that "it is very difficult for there to be a crime" since "Uruguayan legislation requires that there be an effective assistance to suicide in order to charge a crime." Both of the founders stepped down in the wake of The New York Times investigation.

In April 2019, the original .com domain of Sanctioned Suicide was blocked by the Australian Federal Police under Section 313 of the Telecommunications Act 1997. An investigation by the Australian Broadcasting Corporation found that deaths from sodium nitrite spiked in Australia following its promotion on the website. In response to these deaths, the Therapeutic Goods Administration in Australia reclassified the substance, further restricting its sale. Following the publication of the ABC investigation, Sanctioned Suicide blocked access to the site in Australia, stating "anti-liberty countries will just be blocked." While the .org domain remains blocked in Australia, access to the site remains unrestricted through the .net and .site domains. 

In December 2021, members of the U.S. House of Representatives wrote to Attorney General Merrick Garland to clarify what action could be taken against the site under U.S. law. Following a statement from the House Committee on Energy and Commerce, Bing responded by lowering the ranking of the site in its search results. Many U.S. states have laws against assisting suicide, but they are often vague, do not explicitly address online activity, and are rarely enforced.

See also 

 alt.suicide.holiday
 Right to die
 Antinatalism
 Suicide prevention

Notes

References 

Suicide and the Internet
Internet properties established in 2018
Subreddits
Internet-related controversies
Internet ethics
Suicide
Virtual communities
Reddit
Death